Cakes and Ale, or, The Skeleton in the Cupboard (1930) is a novel by the British author W. Somerset Maugham. Maugham exposes the misguided social snobbery levelled at the character Rosie Driffield, whose frankness, honesty, and sexual freedom make her a target of conservative opprobrium. Her character is treated favourably by the book's narrator, Ashenden, who understands that she was a muse to the many artists who surrounded her, and who himself enjoyed her sexual favours.

Maugham drew his title from the remark of Sir Toby Belch to Malvolio in William Shakespeare's Twelfth Night: "Dost thou think, because thou art virtuous, there shall be no more cakes and ale?" Cakes and ale are also the emblems of the good life in the moral of the fable attributed to Aesop, "The Town Mouse and the Country Mouse": "Better beans and bacon in peace than cakes and ale in fear."

In his introduction to a Modern Library edition, published in 1950, Maugham wrote, "I am willing enough to agree with common opinion that Of Human Bondage is my best work ... But the book I like best is Cakes and Ale ... because in its pages lives for me again the woman with the lovely smile who was the model for Rosie Driffield."

Plot summary
The story is told by a first-person narrator and well-to-do author, William Ashenden, who, at the beginning of the novel is suddenly and unexpectedly contacted by Alroy Kear, a busybody literary figure in London who has been asked by Amy, the second Mrs Driffield, to write the biography of her deceased husband, Edward Driffield. Driffield, once scorned for his realist representation of late-Victorian working-class characters, had in his later years come to be lionised by scholars of English letters. The second Mrs Driffield, a nurse to the ailing Edward after his first wife left him, is known for her propriety, and her interest in augmenting and cementing her husband's literary reputation. Her only identity is that of caretaker of her husband in life and of his reputation in death. It is well-known, however, that Driffield wrote his best novels while he was married to his first wife and muse, Rosie.

Kear, who is trying to prove his own literary worth, jumps at the opportunity to ride the coat-tails of the great Edward Driffield by writing the biography. Knowing that Ashenden had a long acquaintanceship with the Driffields as a young man, Kear contacts him for inside information about Edward's past, including about his first wife, who has been oddly erased from the official narrative of Edward's genius.

The story relates Ashenden's recollections of his past associations with the Driffields, especially Rosie. Due to his intimate association with her he hesitates to reveal how much information he will divulge to Driffield's second wife and Kear, who ostensibly wants a "complete" picture of the famous author, but who routinely glosses over the untoward stories that might upset Driffield's surviving wife. Ashenden holds the key to the deep mystery of love, and the act of love, in the life of each character, as he recounts a history of creativity, infidelity and literary memory.

Publishing history
Cakes and Ale was first published in serialised form in four issues of Harper's Bazaar (February, March, April, and June 1930). The first edition of the novel was published in September the same year by William Heinemann in London and the Garden City Publishing Company in Garden City, New York.

Characters
William Ashenden: Author-narrator.
Amy Driffield: Nurse and second wife to Edward Driffield.
Edward Driffield (Ted): Late-Victorian realist author.
Rosie Driffield/Iggulden (née Gann): First wife of Edward Driffield, second wife of George Kemp.
Miss Fellows: Ashenden's landlady.
Mrs Hudson: Ashenden's first London landlady.
Alroy Kear: Biographer of Edward Driffield, literary acquaintance of Ashenden.
George Kemp/Iggulden (Lord George): Vivacious middle-class coal merchant and entrepreneur of Blackstable who runs off with Mrs Driffield to the United States and changes his name to Iggulden to protect himself from prosecution.
Mrs Barton Trafford: Patron of the arts and generous supporter of Edward Driffield.
The Vicar, Mr Ashenden: William's conservative uncle who initially forbids his nephew to fraternise with Ted and Rosie Driffield.
Mary-Ann: Maid to the Ashendens in Blackstable, childhood acquaintance of Rosie Driffield, and caretaker of young Ashenden.

Real-life counterparts
Two of the novel's principal characters, Alroy Kear and Edward Driffield, were widely interpreted by contemporaneous readers as thinly veiled and unflattering characterizations of, respectively, the novelists Hugh Walpole and Thomas Hardy (who had died two years previously).  In response to a letter from Walpole inquiring about the association, Maugham denied it: "I certainly never intended Alroy Kear to be a portrait of you. He is made up of a dozen people and the greater part of him is myself".  In an introduction written for the 1950 Modern Library edition of the book, however, Maugham admitted that Walpole was indeed the inspiration for Kear—but denied that Hardy inspired the Driffield character.

In 1931, a pseudonymous novel called Gin and Bitters by A. Riposte, was published in the United States and told the story of "a novelist who writes novels about other novelists", and furthered the speculation about the Walpole/Kear association. It was rumoured that the author was Hugh Walpole himself, after the novel appeared in England under the title Full Circle. The book was quickly removed from sale by its English publisher, supposedly at the behest of Somerset Maugham. The true author was later discovered to be Elinor Mordaunt.

In The Fine Art of Literary Mayhem, Myrick Land asserts that Cakes and Ale ruined the last 11 years of Walpole's life and destroyed his reputation as a writer.

Adaptations
In 1974, the BBC released a three episode mini-series Cakes and Ale, starring Michael Hordern and Judy Cornwell. It was rebroadcast on Masterpiece Theatre in the US.

References

External links
 

1930 British novels
Novels about writers
Novels by W. Somerset Maugham
Novels first published in serial form
Works originally published in Harper's Bazaar
Heinemann (publisher) books